Magnesium iodide is an inorganic compound with the chemical formula . It forms various hydrates . Magnesium iodide is a salt of magnesium and hydrogen iodide. These salts are typical ionic halides, being highly soluble in water.

Uses
Magnesium iodide has few commercial uses, but can be used to prepare compounds for organic synthesis.

Preparation
Magnesium iodide can be prepared from magnesium oxide, magnesium hydroxide, and magnesium carbonate by treatment with hydroiodic acid:

Reactions
Magnesium iodide is stable at high heat under a hydrogen atmosphere, but decomposes in air at normal temperatures, turning brown from the release of elemental iodine. When heated in air, it decomposes completely to magnesium oxide.

Another method to prepare  is mixing powdered elemental iodine and magnesium metal. In order to obtain anhydrous , the reaction should be conducted in a strictly anhydrous atmosphere; dry-diethyl ether can be used as a solvent.

Usage of magnesium iodide in the Baylis-Hillman reaction tends to give (Z)-vinyl compounds.

References 

Iodides
Magnesium compounds
Alkaline earth metal halides
Deliquescent substances